Bahraich is a constituency of the Uttar Pradesh Legislative Assembly covering the city of Bahraich in the Bahraich district of Uttar Pradesh, India. Bahraich is one of five assembly constituencies in the Bahraich Lok Sabha constituency. Since 2008, this assembly constituency is numbered 286 amongst 403 constituencies.

Currently this seat belongs to Bharatiya Janta Party candidate Anupma Jaiswal who won in last Assembly election of 2017 Uttar Pradesh Legislative Elections defeating Samajwadi Party candidate Rubab Sayda by a margin of 6,702 votes.

Members of the Legislative Assembly

Election results
Waqar Ahmad Shah has won the seat five times.

References

External links
 

Bahraich
Assembly constituencies of Uttar Pradesh